Dame Helen May Reeves DBE (born 22 August 1945) is a former Chief Executive of Victim Support in the UK. She retired in 2005 after 26 years with the organisation.

She has said that "[W]e believe an entirely new way of thinking about crime is needed – one that recognises the needs of victims of crime as the responsibility of the whole community, rather than leaving people to suffer in silence while we focus our attention on offenders."

She wrote the afterword to Victims of Crime: A New Deal?

On 2 November 2004, she received an honorary Doctor of Laws degree from Southampton Institute, in recognition of her 'outstanding contribution' to victims' services.

References

External links
 Restorative Justice Council | Promoting quality restorative practice for everyone Restorative Justice.org
 Curriculum Vitae: Dame Helen May Reeves, The Guardian, 21 December 2005.

Place of birth missing (living people)
1945 births
Living people
Dames Commander of the Order of the British Empire
British chief executives
British women business executives